The 2008–09 North Carolina Tar Heels men's basketball team represented the University of North Carolina at Chapel Hill. The head coach was Roy Williams. The team played its home games in the Dean Smith Center in Chapel Hill, North Carolina, and was a member of the Atlantic Coast Conference.  The team won the 2009 NCAA Division I men's basketball tournament, the fifth NCAA national title in school history.

Preseason
The Tar Heels were a trendy pick to win the National Championship that year, primarily because Wayne Ellington, Danny Green and Ty Lawson decided to withdraw from the 2008 NBA draft, and consensus national Player of the Year Tyler Hansbrough never declared for that draft. In addition, the players had been embarrassed in the previous season's Final Four by Kansas, and they were motivated to atone for that poor performance.  In the preseason ESPN/USA Today Coaches Poll the Tar Heels were ranked #1. They were the first unanimous preseason #1 ranking in the history of the ESPN/USA Today Coaches Poll. UNC also received the first unanimous preseason #1 ranking in the history of the Associated Press Poll.

Recruiting

Roster

Schedule
The Tar Heels rolled through the nonconference schedule, along the way winning the Maui Invitational for the third time.  They sputtered out of the gate to start ACC play, dropping their first two conference games to Boston College and Wake Forest.  However, they recovered to reel off 10 straight conference wins, including a 101–87 thrashing of rival Duke.  Their only relatively close games during this stretch came against the ACC's two Florida teams—most notably against Florida State, in which they escaped with a Ty Lawson buzzer-beater.

They lost to Maryland in overtime, but recovered to win their last three games.  A win over Virginia Tech gave the Tar Heels at least a share of their 27th regular season title (which are not recognized by the ACC as official championships; the tournament winner is declared champion), and third in a row.  They won the title outright with a season-ending win over Duke.

The ACC tournament did not go nearly as well, largely because Ty Lawson was sidelined with an injured big toe.  They needed a last-minute score to defeat Virginia Tech, then fell to Florida State in the second round.  Still, the Tar Heels were rewarded with the #2 ranking in the final AP Poll, behind Louisville.  They also finished third in the final regular-season Coaches Poll, behind Louisville and Memphis.

Despite not making it to the ACC title game, the Tar Heels received the top seed in the NCAA South Region.  It was the 13th time the Tar Heels had been selected as a #1 seed—the most since the NCAA began seeding the tournament field in 1979.  It is also UNC's 41st NCAA appearance—tied with UCLA for the second-most in history.

The Tar Heels played their first- and second-round games at the Greensboro Coliseum, just an hour west of Chapel Hill.  They easily dispatched Radford and LSU to advance to the regionals at the FedExForum in Memphis.  In the regional round, the Heels dismantled Gonzaga 93–77.  In the regional final, they defeated Oklahoma 72–60 to advance to the Final Four for the 18th time in school history—tied with UCLA for the most ever.  The wins in the regional phase were also the school's 100th and 101st wins in the NCAA Tournament, passing Kentucky for most all-time, although Kentucky has reclaimed the top spot as of 2019.

The Tar Heels were the highest seed to reach the Final Four at Ford Field in Detroit; they were the overall #3 seed in the tournament behind Louisville and Pittsburgh.  In the national semifinal, the Tar Heels pounded Villanova 83–69 to advance to the national championship game for the ninth time in school history.  They played against Michigan State, whom the Tar Heels defeated 98–63 during the December 2008 ACC-Big Ten Challenge.  They were no less dominant in the title game, winning 89–72 for the school's fifth NCAA national title—tied for the third-most all-time.  The win capped off one of the most dominant runs in the tournament's history.  The Tar Heels won every game by at least 12 points—a feat all the more remarkable since they upended four teams ranked in the top 15 of the final AP Poll in the process (#10 Gonzaga, #7 Oklahoma, #11 Villanova and #8 Michigan State).  They also led for all but 10 minutes of a possible 240 minutes of game time.  It also allowed Tyler Hansbrough and his fellow seniors to end their careers as the winningest class in school history.

Wayne Ellington was named the tournament's Most Outstanding Player, the fourth Tar Heel to earn the award.

|-
!colspan=12 style=|Exhibition games

|-
!colspan=12 style=| Regular season

|-
!colspan=12 style=| ACC Tournament

|-
!colspan=12 style=| NCAA tournament

Rankings

Team players drafted into the NBA

References 

North Carolina
North Carolina
North Carolina Tar Heels men's basketball seasons
NCAA Division I men's basketball tournament championship seasons
NCAA Division I men's basketball tournament Final Four seasons
Tar
Tar